Lulof Heetjans (27 March 1916 – 4 February 1998) was a Dutch footballer. He played in one match for the Netherlands national football team in 1937.

References

External links
 

1916 births
1998 deaths
Dutch footballers
Netherlands international footballers
Association footballers not categorized by position